RNA-binding protein 12 is a protein that in humans is encoded by the RBM12 gene.

This gene encodes a protein that contains several RNA-binding motifs, potential transmembrane domains, and proline-rich regions. This gene and the gene for copine I overlap at map location 20q11.21. Alternative splicing in the 5' UTR results in two transcript variants. Both variants encode the same protein.

References

Further reading

External links